Adolfo Targioni Tozzetti (13 February 1823 in Florence – 18 September 1902) was an Italian entomologist who specialised in Sternorrhyncha. He was Professor of Botany and Zoology in Florence, associated with Museo di Storia Naturale di Firenze where his collection remains today at La Specola.  He was especially interested in pest species, mainly mealybugs, scale insects and other pests that attack citrus and peaches.  He described many new taxa.

He was a member of the founding committee of La Società Entomologica Italiana.

Works
(partial list)

1867  Studii sulle Cocciniglie. Memorie della Società Italiana di Scienze Naturali. Milano 3: 1-87.
1868 (separate), 1869. Introduzione alla seconda memoria per gli studi sulle cocciniglie, e catalogo dei generi e delle specie della famiglia dei coccidi. Atti della Società Italiana di Scienze Naturali 11: 721-738.
1876. [Mytilaspis flavescens sp. n., on orange and citron, Italy. (?=M. anguinus Boisd.).] (In Italian.) Annali di Agricoltura. (Ministero di Agricoltura, Industria e Commercio). Firenze, Roma 1876: 1-36.
1879. [Diaspis blankenhornii.] Bollettino della Società Entomologica Italiana, Firenze 1879: 17, 32.
1879. Notizie e indicazioni sulla malattia del pidocchio della vite o della fillossera (Phylloxera vastatrix). Roma. Tipografia Eredi Botta 1879 (Estratto da "Annali di Agricoltura" 1879.Num.11). In 8°,
1881. Relazione intorno ai lavori della R. Stazione di Entomologia Agraria di Firenze per gli anni 1877-78. Parte scientifica. Fam. coccidi. Annali di Agricoltura. Ministero di Agricoltura, Industria e Commercio, Firenze, Roma No. 34: 134-161.
1884. Relazione intorno ai lavori della R. Stazione di Entomologia Agraria di Firenze per gli anni 1879-80. Article V. - omotteri. (In Italian). Annali di Agricoltura. Ministero di Agricoltura, Industria e Commercio, Firenze, Roma 1884 Nos 86-89: 383-414.
1886. Sull'insetto che danneggia i gelsi. Rivista di Bachicoltura (1885) 18: 1-3.
1886. Sull'insetto che danneggia i gelsi. Bollettino della Società Entomologica Italiana 19: 184-186.
1891 Animali ed insetti del tabacco in erba e del tabacco secco. Con 100 figure intercalate e 3 tavole litografiche.  Firenze-Roma : Tip. dei fratelli Bencini. /0

References
Anonym 1903: [Targioni Tozzetti, A.] Entomologist's Monthly Magazine (3) 39
Bargagli, P. 1902: [Targioni Tozzetti, A.]  Boll. Soc. geogr. ital. 34
Conci, C. & Poggi, R. 1996: Iconography of Italian Entomologists, with essential biographical data.  Mem. Soc. Ent. Ital. 75 159-382, 418 Fig.

Italian entomologists
1823 births
1902 deaths